Robert Hodges 'Bob' Horne (born 18 December 1939) is a former Australian politician. Born in Newcastle, New South Wales, he attended the University of Newcastle before becoming a teacher. He served on Dungog Shire Council from 1987 to 1990 and Port Stephens Council from 1991 to 1993. In 1993 he was elected to the Australian House of Representatives as the Labor member for Paterson. He was defeated in 1996 by Liberal candidate Bob Baldwin, but defeated Baldwin in 1998. After his defeat by Baldwin in 2001, Horne retired from politics.

References

Australian Labor Party members of the Parliament of Australia
Members of the Australian House of Representatives for Paterson
Members of the Australian House of Representatives
1939 births
Living people
Port Stephens Council
People from Newcastle, New South Wales
21st-century Australian politicians
20th-century Australian politicians